Ixora mooreensis is a species of flowering plant in the family Rubiaceae. It is endemic to Moorea in French Polynesia, hence its name.

References

External links
World Checklist of Rubiaceae

moorensis
Flora of French Polynesia
Least concern plants
Taxonomy articles created by Polbot
Mo'orea
Taxobox binomials not recognized by IUCN